Cable News Network Brazil ( and abbreviated as CNN BR) is a Brazilian news-based pay television channel. Launched on 15 March 2020, CNN Brazil is owned by Novus Media, a joint-venture between Douglas Tavolaro, former header of RecordTV's news division, and Rubens Menin, owner of MRV Engenharia. Novus Media has a licensing agreement with original CNN channel owned by Warner Bros. Discovery. CNN Brazil is the second local franchise of CNN in South America, after CNN Chile.

Its headquarters are in São Paulo, with offices in Rio de Janeiro and Brasília, besides international bureaus with almost 400 journalists. Previously, in 2017, the channel did a partnership with RedeTV! and Simba Content, formed by SBT and RecordTV, which had no success.

Programs are aired 24 hours daily via digital terrestrial TV networks, pay TV providers in Brazil; and live streaming services for overseas viewers.

History
CNN looked to enter the Portuguese language market, one of the only ones still not covered by the many affiliates of the brand around the world. In 2019, it was announced that the broadcaster would act in Brazil, with local strategic partners. The business montage in Brazil was in charge of the businessman Rubens Menin, with a vast and well-known performance in the civic construction and financial markets, and the journalist Douglas Tavolaro, co-founder and CEO of the new channel.

Initially, the first announced names to act in CNN Brazil came from companies such as Globo, Record, BBC and Band. On 4 June 2019, two former TV Globo presenters were announced. Evaristo Costa and William Waack were hired to, respectively, present a show in CNN London headquarters, with a mix of journalism and entertainment, and the second, a TV news during prime time, from Mondays to Fridays. The premiere of the pay television channel is predicted to second semester of 2019. It is expected that CNN Brazil will also have a strong online presence, covering all social medias and innovating in the distribution of journalistic content through these platforms.

On Tuesday, 18 June, images of the CNN Brazil headquarters were published in the broadcaster official profile. The location will be in Paulista Avenue, in the district of Bela Vista, in front of the São Paulo Metro station Trianon-Masp. According to the founder-partner and Chairman of CNN Brazil, Douglas Tavolaro, the decision to establish the future news channel in that place was "strategic", aiming a larger approach with the audience. "We want to be part of the everyday life of the Brazilians and be integrated with the audience. Because of that, the chose to be in the pulsing center and postcard of the largest city in the country, next to the people", said Tavolaro.

On 22 July 2019, the broadcaster announced the hiring of the couple Mari Palma and Phelipe Siani.

On 25 July 2019, CNN Brazil announced the hiring of its first black journalist, Luciana Barreto.

On 3 August 2019, journalist Monalisa Perrone left TV Globo to accept "an irrefusable offer" made by CNN Brazil.

Famous TV reporter and TV presenter Reinaldo Gottino left RecordTV on 16 September 2019 to join CNN Brazil, being the first reporter who wasn't a TV Globo employee to join the new broadcaster.

Taís Lopes who was recently part of the JN local presenters rotation, where stood out and got CNN Brasil to meet on 4 November 2019.

CNN Brazil Staff
 Anchors

 Carol Nogueira (São Paulo)
 Daniela Lima (São Paulo)
 Elisa Veeck (São Paulo)
 Felipe Moura Brasil (São Paulo)
 Luciana Barreto (São Paulo)
 Márcio Gomes (São Paulo)
 Muriel Porfiro (São Paulo)
 Rafael Colombo (São Paulo)
 William Waack (São Paulo)

 Presenters

 Abílio Diniz
 Daniela Filomeno
 Leandro Karnal
 Letícia Vidica
 Lia Bock
 Mari Palma
 Pedro Andrade
 Phelipe Siani
 Roberto Kalil
 Stephanie Alves (Sports)
 Stéphanie Fleury

 Analysts

 Basilia Rodrigues (Politics)
 Caio Junqueira (Politics)
 Fernando Nakagawa (Economy)
 Gustavo Uribe (Politics)
 Iuri Pitta (Politics)
 Lourival Sant’Anna (International)
 Priscila Yazbek (Economy)
 Raquel Landim (Economy)
 Renata Agostini (Politics)
 Thais Arbex (Politics)
 Thais Herédia (Economy)

 Commentators
 Alexandre Schwartsman (Economy)
 Antonio Batista da Silva Junior (Business and Management)
 Aod Cunha (Economy)
 Carmem Perez (Economy and Agribusiness)
 Claudia Costin (Education)
 Daniel Castanho (Companies, Business and Management)
 Erika Bechara (Environment)
 Fernando Gomes (Health)
 João Carlos Martins (Culture)
 Marcos Fava Neves (Economy and Agribusiness)
 Mauricio Pestana (Law and Inclusion)
 Neca Setubal (Management and Inclusion)
 Nina Silva (Entrepreneurship and Diversity)
 Patrícia Travassos (Technology)
 Renan Quinalha (Diversity)
 Rubens Barbosa (Brazil in the World)
 Sergio Vale (Economy)

Correspondents
 Américo Martins (London)
 Flávia Duarte (London)
 Mariana Janjácomo (New York)

Reporters

 Adriana de Luca (São Paulo)
 Anne Barbosa (São Paulo)
 Bruna Macedo (São Paulo)
 Carol Queiroz (Manaus)
 Caroline Rosito (Brasília)
 Daniela Mallmann (Belo Horizonte)
 Diego Barros (Recife)
 Iara Maggioni (Curitiba)
 João Carlos Borda (Ribeirão Preto)
 Julliana Lopes (Brasília)
 Karla Chaves (São Paulo)
 Larissa Rodrigues (Brasília)
 Leandro Magalhães (Brasília)
 Leandro Resende (Rio de Janeiro)
 Marina Demori (Goiânia)
 Matheus Meirelles (São Paulo)
 Mathias Brotero (Brasília)
 Nohlan Hubertus (Brasília)
 Paula Martini (Rio de Janeiro)
 Paula Nobre (São Paulo)
 Pedro Duran (Rio de Janeiro)
 Pedro Teixeira (Brasília)
 Rafaela Cascardo (Rio de Janeiro)
 Rachel Amorim (Rio de Janeiro)
 Renan Fiuza (São Paulo)
 Silvana Freire (Salvador)
 Tainá Falcão (São Paulo)
 Tainá Farfan (Brasília)
 Teo Cury (Brasília)

Former integrants

 Alana Araújo
 Alexandre Borges
 Alexandre Garcia (Jovem Pan)
 Alisson Negrini
 Ananda Vasconcelos (BM&C News)
 André Janvaski (Estado de São Paulo)
 André Mifano
 André Spigariol (Crusoé)
 Anthony Wells
 Arianna Fonseca (TV Brasília)
 Augusto de Arruda Botelho
 Bárbara Baião (Jota)
 Boris Casoy
 Bruna Carvalho
 Bruna Ostermann
 Bruno Garschagen
 Bruno Salles
 Caio Coppolla
 Carla Bridi
 Carla Vilhena
 Carolina Abelin (Jovem Pan)
 Carolina Brígido (UOL)
 Caroline Louise
 Cassius Zeilmann (BandNews TV)
 Chico Prado
 Cleber Rodrigues
 Cris Dias (Rede Bandeirantes)
 Débora Freitas (CBN São Paulo)
 Diego Rezende (América TV)
 Diego Sarza (BandNews TV/UOL)
 Eduardo Carvalho (UOL)
 Evandro Cini
 Evaristo Costa
 Felipe Boldrini (EPTV Campinas)
 Fernando Molica
 Gabriela Prioli
 Gabrielle Ravasco
 Galton Sé
 Gisele Soares
 Glória Vanique
 Heloísa Villela
 Iara Oliveira
 Igor Gadelha (Metrópoles)
 Isabella Faria
 Isabelle Saleme
 Jairo Nascimento
 Jaqueline Frizon
 Jhonatã Gabriel (TVE Bahia)
 João Venturi (SBT)
 Kenzô Machida
 Lara Mota (TV Iguaçu)
 Larissa Alvarenga (Metrópoles)
 Leandro Narloch (Folha de São Paulo)
 Lucas Madureira
 Lucilene Kaxinawá (SIC TV)
 Luiza Duarte
 Luiza Muttoni
 Luiza Tenan
 Marcela Monteiro
 Marcela Rahal
 Manuella Niclewicz (RICtv)
 Mateus Koelzer (Jovem Pan)
 Monalisa Perrone
 Natália André
 Núria Saldanha
 Paula Brazão
 Rachel Vargas
 Reinaldo Gottino (RecordTV)
 Renan de Souza
 Ricardo Caldas (TV Brasil)
 Ricardo Pereira (BandNews FM RJ)
 Rita Lisauskas
 Rita Wu
 Sandro Zeppi
 Sid Marcus
 Sidney Rezende
 Soraya Lauand
 Taís Lopes (TV Verdes Mares)
 Talis Mauricio
 Thiago Anastácio
 Tiago Américo
 Tomé Abduch (Jovem Pan)
 Vinícius Costa

Programming

CNN Brasil Soft

Former programs

References

External links

  
 
 
 

Brazil
24-hour television news channels in Brazil
Television channels and stations established in 2020
Brazilian news websites
Warner Bros. Discovery networks